Edward Rush may refer to:
 Edward Rush (cricketer), Australian cricketer
 Edward Rush (priest), Irish Anglican priest

See also
 Eddie Rush (born 1961), basketball referee
 Ed T. Rush (born 1942), basketball referee
 Ed Rush, drum and bass producer and DJ